I Will Consult Mister Brown (Spanish: Consultaré a Mister Brown)  is a 1946 Spanish comedy film directed by Pío Ballesteros and starring Monique Thibaut, José Franco and Valeriano Andrés. It is based on the 1928 novel The Partner by the Chilean writer Jenaro Prieto. In order to stave off financial ruin, a man creates a fake business partner.

Cast
 Valeriano Andrés as Anselmo García  
 Lola Barrea 
 José Franco  
 Guillermo Marín 
 Amparo Reyes 
 Pilar Sala
 Monique Thibaut 
 María Jesús Valdés 
 Pepita C. Velázquez

References

Bibliography 
 Augusto M. Torres. Directores españoles malditos. Huerga Y Fierro Editores, 2004.

External links 
 

1946 comedy films
Spanish comedy films
1946 films
1940s Spanish-language films
Films based on Chilean novels
Films scored by Jesús García Leoz
Spanish black-and-white films
1940s Spanish films